P'iq'iñ Q'ara (Aymara p'iq'iña head, q'ara bare, bald, p'iq'iña q'ara bald, "baldheaded", also spelled Phekhen Khara) is a  mountain in the Cordillera Real in the Andes of Bolivia. It is situated in the La Paz Department, Murillo Province, Palca Municipality. P'iq'iñ Q'ara lies southwest of the mountain Pupusani, west to northwest of Ch'iyar Qullu and northwest of Illimani.

References 

Mountains of La Paz Department (Bolivia)